List of rulers of the Maasai (Kenya)

(Dates in italics indicate de facto continuation of office)

{|
Term
Incumbent
Notes

|-
|Laibon (rulers)
|1850  to 1866   Laibon Supet
|-
|1866 to 1888||Mbatian 
|-
|1888||Incorporated into British East Africa 
|-
|1888 to 1890||Mbatian, Laibon
|-
|-1890 to     ||Senteu, King 
|1890 to 1904||Lenana, Laibon
|-
|1904 to 1911||Lenana, Paramount Chief 
|-
|1911 to 1918||Segi (Maasai Chief)|Segi, Paramount Chief 
|-
|1918||Chiefdom abolished by the British authorities
|}

The Laibon originated as chief ritual leaders, later emerging as leaders exercising both political and military authority.

Lists of African rulers
Lists of rulers of Kenya